Daan Viljoen Game Reserve is a game reserve near Windhoek, Namibia. It is situated in the hill area of Khomas Hochland.
The park has many walking paths and allows tourists to travel around by themselves. The park is a good example of the wildlife of Namibia. It is named for Daniel Thomas du Plessis Viljoen (1892–1972), the South African administrator of South West Africa from 1953 to 1963.

The park covers an area of 40 square kilometers, and provides a home to many plant and animal species.

References

External links
 Namibian.org Daan Viljoen Game Reserve
 Daan Viljoen Game Lodge

Nature reserves in Namibia
Geography of Windhoek
Wildlife parks